Casparus Cornelius "Corniel" van Zyl (born 27 January 1979) is a South African-born Italian former rugby union footballer who played at lock. Van Zyl was part of the Italian squad at the 2011 Rugby World Cup. He is currently a coach at Premiership Rugby side London Irish.

He played for Italian side Treviso for eight seasons from 2007 to 2015 before retiring as a player to become the forwards coach at the Free State Cheetahs.

Van Zyl left the Free State Cheetahs in 2020 and joined London Irish as an assistant coach on 30 January 2021.

References

External links
 
 2011 Rugby World Cup Profile

1979 births
Living people
Italian rugby union players
Italy international rugby union players
Lions (United Rugby Championship) players
Cheetahs (rugby union) players
Free State Cheetahs players
Pumas (Currie Cup) players
South African emigrants to Italy
Benetton Rugby players
Italian sportspeople of African descent
Rugby union locks